Richard Earle (November 7, 1908 – June 26, 1984) was an American painter. His work was part of the painting event in the art competition at the 1932 Summer Olympics.

References

1908 births
1984 deaths
20th-century American painters
American male painters
Olympic competitors in art competitions
People from Los Angeles
20th-century American male artists